Shurabad-e Nur Mohammad (also Romanized as Shūrābād-e Nūr Moḩammad; also known as Shoor Abad, Shūrābād, Shūrābād-e Nūr, and Shūrābād-e Zard) is a village in Posht Rud Rural District, in the Central District of Narmashir County, Kerman Province, Iran. At the 2006 census, its population was 426, in 98 families.

References 

Populated places in Narmashir County